Bernard Amos Malango (1941 – 30 October 2021) was a Zambian Anglican prelate. He was the Anglican Archbishop of Central Africa from 2000 to September 2006, when he retired.

Early life and education
Malango started his career as a draughtsman.  He attended St John's Seminary in Lusaka, Zambia, and graduated there in 1971, obtaining a Diploma in Theology. He was later sent to Trinity College, Dublin, where he graduated with the degree of M. Phil.

Positions held 
He was ordained in 1971, became a priest in 1972 and was consecrated in 1988. He obtained a Master of Philosophy at University of Dublin in 1984.

From 1974 to 1988, Malango was in Malawi. He was Bishop's Chaplain in Malosa from 1974 to 1976; from 1978 to 1981 he was Executive Secretary/Treasurer of ACLCA; and from 1984 to 1988 he was Convenor in Malawi of the Islam Project in Africa.

From 1988 to 2001, he was Bishop of Northern Zambia, became Archbishop of Central Africa in 2000 until his retirement in 2006. He was also the Bishop of Upper Shire since 2001.

His office was located in Chilema, near Zomba, Malawi.

Windsor Report
Malango was a member of the Lambeth Commission on Communion which drafted the Windsor Report.

His views on trying to keep the Anglican Communion together in spite of differences over homosexuality have put him at odds with other bishops in the province, specifically former bishop Nolbert Kunonga of Zimbabwe.

Publications
Christian-Muslim Dialogue in Malawi 1989

References 

1941 births
2021 deaths
Zambian Anglicans
Anglican archbishops of Central Africa
20th-century Anglican bishops in Africa
21st-century Anglican bishops in Africa
21st-century Anglican archbishops
Anglican bishops of Upper Shire